NGC 3267 is a lenticular galaxy in the constellation Antlia. It was discovered on April 18, 1835 by the astronomer John Herschel.

References

Antlia
Lenticular galaxies
3267
18350418
Antlia Cluster
030934